The Maringar are an indigenous Australian people of the Northern Territory.

Country
In Norman Tindale's estimate the Maringar had about  midway along the Moyle River and its contiguous swamplands and various tributaries.

Social organisation
The Maringar were composed of six clans. Their society was described in a monograph by the Norwegian ethnographer Johannes Falkenberg, based on fieldwork done in 1950, a work judged by Rodney Needham to be 'a masterly monograph which must immediately be ranked with the classics of Australian anthropology.'

Alternative names
 Muringar, Murrinnga, Muringa.
 Yaghanin.
 Moil (meaning "plain" or "plain country")
 Moyle. (European exonym)

Notes

Citations

Sources

Aboriginal peoples of the Northern Territory